The 1999 CONCACAF Champions' Cup was the 35th edition of the annual international club football competition held in the CONCACAF region (North America, Central America and the Caribbean), the CONCACAF Champions' Cup. It determined that year's club champion of association football in the CONCACAF region.

The Final Tournament was held at Sam Boyd Stadium in Whitney, Nevada in the United States. Necaxa defeated Alajuelense in the final by a score of 2-1.

Qualified teams

North American zone
Major League Soccer: Chicago Fire - 1998 MLS Cup winner  D.C. United - 1998 MLS Cup runner-up Los Angeles Galaxy - 1998 MLS Supporters' Shield winner
Primera División de México: Toluca - 1998 Verano winner Club Necaxa - 1998 Invierno winner

Central American zone
1999 UNCAF Interclub Cup:  Olimpia - Central Zone final round first place Alajuelense - Central Zone final round second place Deportivo Saprissa - Central Zone final round third place

Caribbean zone
1998 CFU Club Championship: Joe Public F.C. - Caribbean Zone winner

Qualifying playoff

 Necaxa advances to the Quarterfinals

Bracket

Quarterfinals

Semifinals

Third place match

 Third place was shared.

Final

Champion

 Necaxa qualifies for the 2000 FIFA Club World Championship.
1975 - First title under the organization name of Atlético Español.

References

CONCACAF Champions' Cup
c
c
c